The Collector of Customs at the Port of New York, most often referred to as Collector of the Port of New York, was a federal officer who was in charge of the collection of import duties on foreign goods that entered the United States by ship at the Port of New York.

The best-known individual to hold the position was Chester A. Arthur, who served as collector from 1871–1878 and who later served as the 21st president of the United States.

History
The first Collector, John Lamb, was appointed by George Washington in 1789. He had previously served as Collector of Customs for the State of New York from 1784.

The office was described as "the prize plum of Federal patronage not only in this State but perhaps in the country, outside of positions in the Cabinet." Customs collections at US ports were overseen by three political appointees—the Collector, Surveyor, and Naval Officer.  Because they were originally paid based on a percentage system that factored in both customs collected and fines levied for those who attempted to evade payment, these appointments were very lucrative, especially those at the Port of New York, by far America's busiest port.  New York's Collector was the highest paid official of the federal government; as Collector from 1871 to 1878, Chester A. Arthur's compensation exceeded the modern equivalent of $1 million annually.  The custom house staffs, especially at New York's Custom House were also political appointees, and were expected to contribute a portion of their salaries to the party to which they owed their appointments.

Disputes over patronage at the Port of New York led to an ongoing feud from the 1860s to the 1880s between the party faction led by Roscoe Conkling and reformers who counted Rutherford B. Hayes and James A. Garfield among their number.  The attempts at reform that began in the 1870s led to the political appointees at each port being placed on salaries rather than the percentage system.  The annual salary in 1920 was $12,000 (about $153,000 in 2019) plus about $8,000 in fees (about $102,000 in 2019).

The position was abolished in 1966 when the structure of the United States Customs Service was changed.  The last Collector, Joseph P. Kelly, was kept on temporarily as a consultant.

List of collectors

See also
Port Authority of New York & New Jersey
Roscoe Conkling

Notes

References

External links
 Department of the Treasury. Customs Service. Collection District of New York. Port of Entry, New York,. 7/31/1789-1927